Ten is the ninth studio album by American singer Brian McKnight. It was released on December 5, 2006, on Warner Bros. Records, his first and only album for the label.  The album features a guest appearance from Rascal Flatts. Upon its release the album received mixed reviews from music critics, who praised the vocals but criticized production. The album debuted at number 32 on the US Billboard 200, selling about 63,000 copies in its first week. The lead single, "Find Myself In You", first appeared on the soundtrack to the 2006 Tyler Perry film Madea's Family Reunion, which had been released ten months earlier. The second single was "Used to Be My Girl", followed in 2007 by "What's My Name".

Background
McKnight is said to be experimenting with country-style music on the album.
Rhapsody had a week-long (Nov. 27- Dec 1) preview of the entire album for free, the final album leaked two days later.

Critical reception

Mark Edward Nero from About.com found that McKnight's decision to leave Motown Records "has proven to be a good one for McKnight who sounds completely rejuvenated on his tenth album, appropriately titled Ten. Not only is Ten an all-around better album than his last Motown release, 2005's Gemini, it arguably ranks among his best three or four albums ever." In his review for Allmusic, Andy Kellman remarked that "just about the smartest thing Brian McKnight could do in 2006 is collaborate with Tim & Bob, a veteran do-it-all studio duo who have quietly contributed to many of the best and/or most successful R&B tracks [...] With 2005's Gemini and this release – two of his finest albums – McKnight is on something of a roll."

Billboard magazine wrote: "Now an elder statesman in the R&B and pop arenas, McKnight offers another mood-setting mix of midtempo cuts and ballads." Margeaux Watson from Entertainment Weekly gave the album a C+ rating felt that "Brian McKnight’s slick sound is favored by the urban adult-contemporary set, and it’s unlikely he’ll win any new (read: young) fans with his 10th album. Mostly produced by the singer-songwriter himself, Ten is a merrily generic batch of R&B grooves and slow jams." SoulTracks's Detrel Howell wrote that "Ten will more than likely shine for Brian McKnight's diehard fans who support his  music without fail; for me, it wasn't chock full of all that I'd hoped for after hearing "Find Myself in You," but it won't be banished to the archives just yet."

Track listing

Charts

Weekly charts

Year-end charts

References

Brian McKnight albums
2006 albums
Albums produced by Brian McKnight
Albums produced by Bryan-Michael Cox
Albums produced by Tim & Bob
Warner Records albums